Serge Joseph Bernier (born April 29, 1947) is a Canadian former professional ice hockey right winger who played seven seasons in the National Hockey League (NHL) for the Philadelphia Flyers, Los Angeles Kings and Quebec Nordiques and six seasons in the World Hockey Association (WHA) for Quebec, where he scored a majority of his 308 combined goals (NHL and WHA), between 1968 and 1981. His 230 goals in the WHA were third-most for the Nordiques during their time in the league behind Real Cloutier and Marc Tardif. He was the first draft pick in Philadelphia Flyers history.

He was traded along with Bill Lesuk and Jim Johnson from the Flyers to the Kings for Ross Lonsberry, Bill Flett, Jean Potvin and Eddie Joyal on January 28, 1972.

In 2010, Bernier was part of the initial group of players elected to the World Hockey Association Hall of Fame.

Career statistics

Regular season and playoffs

International

References

External links
 

1947 births
Living people
Canadian ice hockey right wingers
French Quebecers
Ice hockey people from Quebec
Los Angeles Kings players
National Hockey League first-round draft picks
People from Matane
Philadelphia Flyers draft picks
Philadelphia Flyers players
Quebec Aces (AHL) players
Quebec Nordiques players
Quebec Nordiques (WHA) players
Sorel Éperviers players